Cyrtodactylus gubaot  is a species of gecko that is endemic to Leyte in the Philippines.

References

Cyrtodactylus
Reptiles described in 2010